Sayantuy (Saianta) is a rural locality (a settlement) in Tarbagataysky District, Republic of Buryatia, Russia. The population was 138 as of 2010. There are 9 streets.

Geography 
Sayantuy is located 29 km north of Tarbagatay (the district's administrative centre) by road. Voznesenovka is the nearest rural locality.

References 

Rural localities in Tarbagataysky District